Rivarossi is an Italian manufacturers of model railways. In 2004 it was acquired by Hornby Railways.

History

Rivarossi was founded in 1945 by Alessandro Rossi and Antonio Riva. 
In the 1990s Rivarossi acquired Lima (1992), Jouef and Arnold (1997). In 2003 Rivarossi went into receivership.

In 2004 Hornby Railways plc acquired assets from Rivarossi, in particular the brands Arnold, Jouef, Rivarossi and Lima. Since 2006 products are sold again under these brand names. The production has been moved to China.

United States
From 1957 Rivarossi HO models were licensed and sold by Lionel as Lionel HO. The cooperation with Lionel broke down over financial issues after only a year. From 1958 Rivarossi products were sold through Athearn. After Athearn, just about all Rivarossi products, and its sister company Pocher, were distributed through AHM (Associated Hobby Manufacturers).

References

External links

Rivarossi history

Italian companies established in 1945
Toy companies established in 1945
2004 mergers and acquisitions
Model manufacturers of Italy
Model railroad manufacturers
Toy train manufacturers
Toy companies of Italy
Toy brands
Hornby Railways
Italian brands